XHOY-FM is a radio station on 90.7 FM in Guadalajara. The station is known as Señal 90.

History
XHOY received its first concession on November 17, 1978. It was owned by the successors of María Cruz de la Torre until being sold to Lomeli Radio in the 1990s.

References

Radio stations in Guadalajara
Radio stations established in 1978